Sophora microphylla, common name kōwhai, is a species of flowering plant in the family Fabaceae, native to New Zealand. In early spring it produces many racemes of pea-like yellow flowers.

Other common names include weeping kōwhai and small-leaved kōwhai. It is also referred to as South Island Kowhai although this name is misleading since it is widely distributed all over New Zealand including the North Island, though less common in Northland.

The specific epithet microphylla means "small-leaved". S. microphylla has smaller leaves (around 3–6 mm long by 2–5 mm wide) and flowers (1.8-5.0 cm long), than the other well known species Sophora tetraptera (large-leaved kōwhai).

When young S. microphylla has a divaricating and bushy growth habit with many interlacing branches, which begins to disappear as the tree ages.

The cultivar  'Hilsop' has gained the Royal Horticultural Society's Award of Garden Merit. 

Its nectar is toxic to the honeybee.

Pre-human forests 
Studies of accumulated dried vegetation in the pre-human mid-late Holocene period suggests a low Sophora microphylla forest ecosystem in Central Otago that was used and perhaps maintained by giant moa birds, for both nesting material and food. Neither the forests nor moa existed when European settlers came to the area in the 1850s.

See also 
 Kōwhai

References 

microphylla
Trees of New Zealand
Divaricating plants